The Corriere dell'Umbria is the main regional daily newspaper of Umbria. The paper was first published on 18 May 1983. Its publisher is Gruppo Corriere.

References

External links
Corriere dell'Umbria

1983 establishments in Italy
Daily newspapers published in Italy
Italian-language newspapers
Mass media in Umbria
Publications established in 1983